

1998: Detroit Shock, Washington Mystics

Initial player allocation

Expansion draft

1999: Minnesota Lynx, Orlando Miracle

Initial Expansion Player Allocation

Expansion Draft Selections

Post Expansion Draft Player Allocation

2000: Indiana Fever, Miami Sol, Portland Fire, Seattle Storm

2006: Chicago Sky

2008: Atlanta Dream
Source:

References

Expansion